Giuseppe Bertello (born 1 October 1942) is an Italian prelate of the Catholic Church, a cardinal since 2012, who was President of the Pontifical Commission for Vatican City State and President of the Governorate of Vatican City State from October 2011 to October 2021. He worked in the diplomatic service of the Holy See from 1971 to 2011; became an archbishop in 1987; held appointments as Nuncio to several countries, including Rwanda, Mexico, and Italy; and was the Holy See's representative to a number of international organizations.

Early life

Bertello was ordained a priest on 29 June 1966 by Bishop Albino Mensa. He earned a licence in pastoral theology and a doctorate in canon law. He went on to attend the Pontifical Ecclesiastical Academy where he studied diplomacy.

Diplomatic service
He entered the diplomatic service of the Holy See in 1971, and worked until 1973 in the nunciature to the Sudan, which was also the apostolic delegation for the Red Sea region. From 1973 to 1976, he was secretary at the nunciature to Turkey, becoming a Chaplain of His Holiness on 9 February 1976. He was secretary in the nunciature to Venezuela from 1976 to 1981, and served with the rank of auditor in the Office of the Organization of the United Nations in Geneva from 1981 to 1987. In 1987, he headed the delegation of observers of the Holy See to the Conference of Foreign Ministers of the Movement of Non-Aligned Countries in Pyongyang, North Korea, where he was the first Catholic priest to visit the small Catholic community of that country, isolated since the Korean War.

On 17 October 1987, Pope John Paul II named him Titular Archbishop of Urbs Salvia and appointed him Apostolic Nuncio to Ghana, Togo and Benin. He was consecrated on 28 November by Cardinal Agostino Casaroli, with Bishops Albino Mensa and Luigi Bettazzi as the principal co-consecrators. On 12 January 1990, he was transferred to Rwanda, where he supported human rights organizations and encouraged Catholic bishops to unite as forceful advocates for ending civil war. He remained at his post and traveled into dangerous regions to bear witness to the Tutsi Genocide in 1994. In March 1995, John Paul II appointed him Permanent Observer of the Holy See to the United Nations in Geneva from 1997, with the same role at the World Trade Organization. Upon his appointment Bertello negotiated the status of the Holy See as permanent observer in the World Trade Organization, becoming its first representative that year.

On 27 December 2000, John Paul named him Apostolic Nuncio to Mexico. On 30 July 2002, he received the Pope arriving on an apostolic visit in the country for the canonisation of Juan Diego Cuauhtlatoatzin. On 11 January 2006, Bertello was appointed Apostolic Nuncio to Italy and the Republic of San Marino by Pope Benedict XVI.

In 2007, Bertello was awarded the Grand Cross of the Mexican Order of the Aztec Eagle and on 4 October 2008 he was awarded the Knight Grand Cross of the Order of Merit of the Italian Republic.

Curial work

On 3 September 2011, Pope Benedict XVI appointed Bertello President of the Pontifical Commission for Vatican City State and President of the Governorate of Vatican City State, effective 1 October 2011, his 69th birthday. On 6 January 2012, Pope Benedict announced that Bertello would be made a cardinal. He was created Cardinal-Deacon of Santi Vito, Modesto e Crescenzia on 18 February. On 21 April Benedict appointed him to a five-year term as a member of the Congregation for the Evangelization of Peoples, the Congregation for Bishops, and the Pontifical Council for Justice and Peace.

He was one of the cardinal electors who participated in the 2013 papal conclave that elected Pope Francis.

On 13 April 2013 he was appointed to the Council of Cardinal Advisers established by Francis to advise him in devising a plan for restructuring the Roman Curia. Francis made him a member of the Administration of the Patrimony of the Apostolic See on 10 November 2014 and a member of the Congregation for the Causes of Saints on 3 December 2016. Francis also renewed his appointment at the Pontifical Commission for Vatican City State to 2021.

On 15 October 2020, Pope Francis renewed his term on the Council of Cardinal Advisers.

On 8 September 2021, Pope Francis appointed Bishop Fernando Vérgez Alzaga to succeed Bertello as President of the Pontifical Commission for Vatican City State and President of the Governorate of Vatican City State, effective 1 October 2021, his 79th birthday.

On 4 March 2022, he was elevated to the rank of cardinal priest.

References

External links
 

|-

|-

|-

|-

|-

|-

|-

|-

1942 births
20th-century Italian Roman Catholic titular archbishops
21st-century Italian cardinals
Apostolic Nuncios to Benin
Apostolic Nuncios to Ghana
Apostolic Nuncios to Italy
Apostolic Nuncios to Mexico
Apostolic Nuncios to Rwanda
Apostolic Nuncios to San Marino
Apostolic Nuncios to Togo
Cardinals created by Pope Benedict XVI
Pontifical Ecclesiastical Academy alumni
Presidents of the Pontifical Commission for Vatican City State
Knights Grand Cross of the Order of Merit of the Italian Republic
Living people
Members of the Congregation for Bishops
Members of the Congregation for the Evangelization of Peoples